Amina Gautier is an American writer and academic. She is the author of three short story collections, many individual stories, as well as works of literary criticism.

Early life and education
Gautier was born and raised in New York. After participating in Prep for Prep, she attended the Nightingale Bamford School before graduating from Northfield Mount Hermon. She then went to Stanford, where she earned bachelor's and master's degrees in English literature. She continued her education at the University of Pennsylvania, where she earned a master's degree and a Ph.D. in English literature.

She held a Mellon Minority Undergraduate Fellowship at Stanford University, a Fontaine Fellowship at the University of Pennsylvania, a Mitchem Dissertation Fellowship at Marquette University, and a Postdoctoral Fellowship at Washington University in St. Louis.

Career
Gautier is a scholar of 19th century American literature. She has written criticism of the nineteenth century American authors Charles W. Chesnutt, Paul Laurence Dunbar, Elleanor Eldridge, Benjamin Franklin, Nathaniel Hawthorne, Harriet Beecher Stowe and Walt Whitman. Her critical essays and reviews have appeared in African American Review, Belles Lettres, Daedalus, Journal of American History, Libraries and Culture, Nineteenth Century Contexts and Whitman Noir. She has received fellowships from the Northeast Modern Language Association (NeMLA), the Social Science Research Council and the Woodrow Wilson Foundation.

Writer
Gautier has published more than 85 short stories. Her fiction has appeared in a wide variety of magazines and story collections, and some of her stories have been reprinted in anthologies.

Her collection of short stories, Now We Will Be Happy, won the Prairie Schooner Book Prize, and her second collection, At-Risk, won the Flannery O'Connor Award for Short Fiction.

In 2016, Gautier published her third short story collection, The Loss of All Lost Things (Elixir Press).

Awards

Gautier has been the recipient of the Crazyhorse Prize, the Danahy Fiction Prize, the Jack Dyer Prize, the William Richey Prize, the Schlafly Microfiction Award and the Lamar York Prize in Fiction.

Teacher
Gautier has taught at the University of Pennsylvania, Marquette University, Saint Joseph's University and Washington University in St. Louis. Most recently, Gautier taught at DePaul University. In fall 2014, she joined the faculty in the MFA program at the University of Miami.

References

External links
 Interview with Gautier, Derek Alger, pif Magazine (2012)
 Interview with Gautier, Julia Brown, Mosaic Magazine (2016)
 Interview with Gautier, Claire Martin, Hair Trigger (2017)
 Interview with Gautier, Jennifer Maritza McCauley, Fiction Writers Review (2018)
 Interview with Gautier, Bret Meier, Pleiades (2019)
 Interview with Gautier, Arts and Letters, NPR (2020)

Year of birth missing (living people)
Living people
21st-century American women writers
21st-century American short story writers
American literary critics
Women literary critics
Delta Sigma Theta members
Flannery O'Connor Award for Short Fiction winners
Writers from Chicago
Writers from Florida
Writers from New York City
Stanford University alumni
University of Pennsylvania alumni
DePaul University faculty
Marquette University faculty
University of Miami faculty
University of Pennsylvania faculty
Washington University in St. Louis faculty
Northfield Mount Hermon School alumni
21st-century American non-fiction writers
Nightingale-Bamford School alumni
American women critics
Washington University in St. Louis fellows